Exergy is software developed by SilverBridge Holdings, a South African developer of business software for the financial services market in Africa.

SilverBridge Holdings was listed on the AltX Stock Index on November 27, 2006.

Focus area 
The software is designed for life insurance companies to assist them in the administration of their policies.

In 2012, SilverBridge entered into a partnership with Net2Africa.

Exergy celebrated its 10th anniversary in 2014. In the same year, the software saw the introduction of Exergy KnowledgeBase, designed to provide a way of reducing risk in IT projects.

Business in Africa 
At the company's 2016 results, it was reported that Exergy is being used by businesses across Africa including in Angola, Botswana, Kenya, Malawi, Mauritius, and Ghana.

In November 2016, it was reported that SilverBridge has done an implementation at GetSure Zimbabwe to help the company migrate its business to a cloud computing system. The solution was based on the Exergy system.

References 

Business software
Financial software
Finance in Africa